Leutnant Hans Böhning, Iron Cross, was a German World War flying ace credited with 17 aerial victories. He served the German Empire first as an artilleryman, then as an aerial observer for artillery, as a fighter pilot, and finally as the Staffelführer of a fighter squadron.

He would survive the war and die in a gliding accident on 20 October 1934.

Early life and ground service
Hans Böhning was born on 6 July 1893 in the Kingdom of Bavaria. Early in World War I, he served in Bavaria's Field Artillery Regiment No. 13.

Aviation service

Böhning made the transition to aviation in 1916. He began his flying career with Feldflieger Abteilung (Field Flier Detachment) 290, which was an artillery cooperation unit, on 26 April 1917. He transferred from FA(A) 290 on 3 July 1917, to take training as a fighter pilot. He survived an accident on 17 July 1917. Upon completion of training, Böhning was transferred to Royal Prussian Jagdstaffel 36. He scored his first  victory with them on 23 August 1917. He scored his fourth triumph with the unit on 27 October 1917. He was then transferred to Royal Bavarian Jagdstaffel 76 and scored his fifth win over opposing fighter planes on 1 December 1917. By February, 1918, he had transferred to another Bavarian squadron, Jagdstaffel 79.

He now began his greatest string of victories while flying a Pfalz D.III with his initials painted aft of the cockpit. He would upgrade to a newer Albatros D.Va with a fuselage ringed by blue and white stripes and decked by the ace of spades, its upper tail surfaces bearing both light and dark blue stripes. Between 22 March 1918 and 18 September, he tallied another dozen victories, including three over enemy observation balloons. On 20 September 1918, he was wounded while using a Fokker D.VII to fight British Airco DH.9s over Soriel. On 1 November 1918, he was selected to command Bavarian Jagdstaffel 32; the war ended 11 days after his appointment. He was awarded both classes of the Iron Cross during his service.

Post war life
After the war, he took on sport aviation and gliding. He took part in the F.A.I.  International Tourist Plane Contest - Challenge International de Tourisme 1930, taking the 34th position (for 35 classified competitors, of 60 starting ones).
Hans Böhning was killed in a glider accident on 20 October 1934.

Postwar tribute
During its restoration in 2013, Old Rhinebeck Aerodrome's airworthy reproduction Albatros D.Va was changed from Eduard Ritter von Schleich's color scheme to that of Böhning's, when he flew for Jasta 76, with its prominent Rautenflagge rhombus-patterned Bavarian light-blue/white checkerboard state colors for its rear fuselage.

Sources of information

External links
 The Aerodrome website's page on Böhning is at http://www.theaerodrome.com/aces/germany/bohning.php.

References
 Franks, Norman; Bailey, Frank W.; Guest, Russell. Above the Lines: The Aces and Fighter Units of the German Air Service, Naval Air Service and Flanders Marine Corps, 1914–1918. Grub Street, 1993. , .
 Krzyżan, Marian. Międzynarodowe turnieje lotnicze 1929-1934: Volume 37 of Biblioteczka Skrzydlatej Polski. Wydawn, Komunikacji i Łączności, 1988. , 9788320606379.

1893 births
1934 deaths
German World War I flying aces
Recipients of the Iron Cross (1914), 1st class
People from the Kingdom of Bavaria
Military personnel from Bavaria
Aviators killed in aviation accidents or incidents in Germany